Astronesthes richardsoni, or Richardson's snaggletooth, is a species of small, deep sea fish in the family Stomiidae. It occurs in the tropical western Atlantic Ocean, the Caribbean Sea and the Gulf of Mexico. First described by the Cuban zoologist Felipe Poey in 1852,  it was named Chauliodus richardsoni in honour of the Scottish explorer and naturalist John Richardson. It was later transferred to the genus Astronesthes.

Description
Richardson's snaggletooth is a slender, laterally-compressed fish with a short snout, a terminal, horizontal mouth and large fang-like teeth. The teeth on the maxillae are backwards-pointing and comb-like. The long barbel on the chin is ribbon-like and lacks a bulb or swelling at its tip. The dorsal fin has 12 to 14 soft rays and the anal fin has 13 to 18. The origin of the dorsal fin is behind the insertion of the pelvic fins. There is a dorsal adipose fin anterior to the caudal peduncle, and a small ventral adipose fin just anterior to the anus.

Distribution and habitat
The species is found in the mesopelagic zone of the tropical western Atlantic, the Caribbean Sea and the eastern Gulf of Mexico.

Ecology
As a predator, Richardson's snaggletooth feeds on other fish and on krill.

References

Stomiidae
Taxa named by Felipe Poey
Fish described in 1852